Jake Grech (born 18 November 1997) is a Maltese professional footballer currently playing with Hibernians in the Maltese Premier League.

Club career

Ħamrun Spartans
Jake Grech rose through the ranks of Ħamrun Spartans, and debuted with the team in the Maltese First Division. Grech was a protagonist in Ħamrun Spartans' return from all the way down the Maltese Second Division and re-establishment of the Spartans in the Maltese Premier League. Grech was a regular goalscorer and assistman for the Spartans.

Birkirkara
Grech's displays led to interest growing in him over the months. In June 2017, Grech was transferred to Birkirkara F.C. for a record fee of €120,000. Part of Grech's deal saw defender Daniel Zerafa move to Ħamrun. Grech officially signed for Birkirkara on 18 June 2017.

International career
Grech has represented Malta in various youth categories, such as the Malta national under-17 football team, the Malta national under-19 football team and the Malta national under-21 football team. He was instrumental in various matches and showed great promise, at times being decisive for his side.

Upon being promoted as National Team manager, Ray Farrugia decided call up Jake Grech to the senior squad, amongst other players. In fact, Grech's first match with the Malta national football team was against Armenia in a match that ended in a draw.

Style of play
During the team's spell in the lower divisions, Grech received a lot of playing time which helped him develop into a goal-scoring offensive-minded midfielder.

Personal life
Jake is the son of former Ħamrun Spartans star Marco Grech. Jake's brother Luke Grech is also a professional footballer, who also came up through Ħamrun Spartans's youth set up.

References

External links

1997 births
Living people
Maltese footballers
Malta international footballers
Ħamrun Spartans F.C. players
Birkirkara F.C. players
Maltese Premier League players
Malta under-21 international footballers
Malta youth international footballers
Association football midfielders